Nederlander may refer to:

People:
James M. Nederlander (1922–2016), chairman of the Nederlander Organization
Gladys Nederlander (1925–2008), theater and television producer
Joseph Z. Nederlander (1927–2021), executive VP of the Nederlander Organization
Robert Nederlander (born 1933), an attorney and former president of the Nederlander Organization 
James L. Nederlander (born 1960), president of the Nederlander Organization
 

Other:
Nederlander Organization, live theater operator
SHN (theatres), live theater operator, Carole Shorenstein Hays and Robert Nederlander
David T. Nederlander Theatre, 1,232-seat Broadway theater located in New York City
James M. Nederlander Theatre, 2,253-seat theater located in Chicago
De Grootste Nederlander (The Greatest Dutchman) was a 2004 public poll